The pink-spotted fruit dove (Ptilinopus perlatus) is a species of bird in the family Columbidae. It is found in forest and woodland in lowland and foothills of New Guinea and nearby smaller islands. It is widespread and generally common.

Taxonomy and systematics 
The pink-spotted fruit dove is one of over 50 species in the genus Ptilinopus. 

Alternative names for the pink-spotted fruit dove include pink-spotted fruit pigeon.

Subspecies 
Three subspecies of the pink-spotted fruit dove are recognised.

 P. p. perlatus – Temminck, 1835: the nominate subspecies
 P. p. zonurus – Salvadori, 1876:
 P. p. plumbeicollis – Meyer, A.B.,1890:

Description 
As most other fruit doves, it is largely green. The chest is duller and browner, the throat and nape are grey-white, and, uniquely for a fruit dove, the wings are spotted pink. The face and crown are usually olive-green, but this is replaced by pale grey in the north-eastern subspecies plumbeicollis. The male and female are essentially identical.

References

pink-spotted fruit dove
Birds of New Guinea
pink-spotted fruit dove
Taxonomy articles created by Polbot